INMO may refer to:

 Indian National Mathematical Olympiad
 Irish Nurses and Midwives Organisation